Htibyuhsaung Medaw (lit. Royal Mother of Htibyuhsaung), is one of the 37 nats in the Burmese pantheon of nats. She was a grandmother of King Anawrahta of Pagan, and died of illness. She is portrayed with hair knotted and dangling, sitting on folded knees with hand on her lap.

References

29
Burmese goddesses